Eagle Academy is a behavior modification facility. The facility is located on 33800 State Road 80, Belle Glade, Florida.  The academy featured in the show High School Boot Camp.

The target group is "at-risk" girls and boys between 13 and 16 years of age. They have to be resident in Palm Beach County.  They also need to have no felonies on their police record.

Discipline
Eagle Academy strictly enforces discipline: a button not done up, a word out of place or any non conformity could result in 10 push-ups or 20 jumping jacks or more, depending on the infraction.

The program claims to have helped about 80 percent of the detainees to lead a productive life.

According to the new budget of 2013, The Eagle Academy was closed, saving $4.5M a year.

In the news
One of the drill instructors was arrested on the charge of 'battery touch or strike' and 'fraud, false statement.'  Another staff member was arrested and charged of trying to cover up the incident.

In February 2008, another staff member was charged with abuse.

August 2008 a January 2008 graduate was shot suspected of stealing a car 

January 2010-June 2010 Recruits DeLaney, Gousse and Dew were the first to ever perform music that was written at the Academy, DeLaney being the first to ever have a guitar there.

References

External links
Homepage of the facility
Secret prisons for teens (Watch organization) about the facility.
High School Boot Camp on IMDB

Behavior modification
Public high schools in Florida
Boarding schools in Florida
Schools in Palm Beach County, Florida
Special schools in the United States